Dongargaon, Agar Malwa is a town and a Gram Panchayat, near town of Agar in Agar Malwa district in the Indian state of Madhya Pradesh. It is located on the Indore–Kota National Highway (NH 552G) on the bank of Kali Sindh River. It is surrounded by the border with the state of Rajasthan from three sides and is a well-known center of transport business between the two states.

Demographics
As of 2001 India census,[1] Dongargaon is a village with 1424 families and located in Susner Tehsil of Agar Malwa district. As per the population census of 2011 The Dongargaon village has population of 7159 of which 3645 are males while 3514 are females.

In Dongargaon village population of children with age group 0-6 is 913 which makes up 12.75% of total population of village. Average Sex Ratio of Dongargaon village is 964, which is higher than Madhya Pradesh state average of 931. Child Sex Ratio for the Dongargaon as per census is 906, lower than Madhya Pradesh average of 918.

Dongargaon village has lower literacy rate compared to Madhya Pradesh. In 2011, literacy rate of Dongargaon village was 69.21% compared to 69.32% of Madhya Pradesh. In Dongargaon,male literacy stands at 83.45% while female literacy rate was 54.58%.

As per constitution of India and Panchyati Raaj Act, Dongargaon village is administrated by Sarpanch (Head of Village) who is elected representative of village. Our website, don't have information about schools and hospital in Dongargaon village.

Schedule Caste (SC) constitutes 24.89% while Schedule Tribe (ST) were 10.39% of total population in Dongargaon village.

In Dongargaon village out of total population, 3612 were engaged in work activities. 60.55% of workers describe their work as Main Work (Employment or Earning more than 6 Months) while 39.45% were involved in marginal activity providing livelihood for less than 6 months. Of 3612 workers engaged in main work, 756 were cultivators (owner or co-owner) while 830 were Agricultural labourer.

Dongargaon is drained by Kalisindh and Chavli rivers.

Religion
With more than a hundred Hindu temples, Dongargaon has been famous in the local area for many years. Some of the most famous temples in town are Ram Mandir (The temple is in town since 9th Century), Bawadi Balaji Temple, Ganesh Temple, Sagatpur Balaji Temple(Also known as Lakhabir Balaji), Shiv Temple, Bor Mata Temple, Nath ki kuri, Sheetlamata Temple, Ramanreti wale ka Asharam, Radhakrishna Temple, Rawala Mandir, Ram Mandir(Near Rawala), Hanuman Mandir(Brahman Mohalla) also Piplyakhera Balaji and Aashapurna Mata Mandir (Guradiya,Dongargaon). Ram Mandir Temple and Piplyakhera Balaji Temple are said to be one of the oldest temples of India according to archaeological survey, the temples were renovated in 9th century there is a bawari (traditional well) too.

Population of Dongargaon
Particulars Total Male Female

Total Population 7,159 3,645 3,514
Literate Population 4,323 2,642 1,681
Illiterate Population 2,836 1,003 1,833

Nearby towns and cities
Jhalrapatan – 35 km
Jhalawar – 40 km
Agar – 60 km
Ujjain – 120 km
Kota – 124 km
Indore − 180 km
Jaipur – 300 km
Bhopal – 225 km

Nearby villages
Dongargaon, Agar Malwa is surrounded by many cities and villages. There are more than 100 villages around Dongargaon, Agar Malwa. The main villages among them are Shripatpura Kheda, Salyakhedi, Khindiyakheri, Barai, Guradiya, Piplyakheda, Kishanpura, Fatehgarh(Rajsthan), Khejarkheri, Khojakhei, Banor, Nanor, Badai(Rajasthan), Saroniya, Dharonia, Devli, Bijana Khedi, Rawli, Kheriya Soyat.

Kali Sindh Basin
The Kali Sindh Basin stretches between the southern and northern limits of the district. It occupies the major parts of Susner and Shajapur Tehsils and a very small part of Agar Tehsil. The southern part of the region is hilly whereas the northern part is plain. The hills gradually decrease in height from south to north. There are a few scattered hillocks in the central and northern parts also. The altitude of the region varies between 450 and 528 metres above mean sea level. Numerous streams originate from the hilly area and dissect the surface. Kali Sindh is the main river, which traverses the hills and flows further on the eastern border of the district. Lakundar is the main rivulets of Kali Sindh that flows northwards. Geologically, the entire region is a part of the Deccan Trap of the Cretaceous Eocene period. Its main tributary, Kalisindh River, is the largest source of water in Dongargaon.

Language
The main languages spoken in Dongargaon are Hindi, Malwi, and Rajasthani.

Banking facilities
The list of banks functioning in Dongargaon :
Indian Bank, Dongargaon Branch

The ATM of SBI is also available near bus stand.

Connectivity of Dongargaon
Type Status

Public Bus Service Available within village.
Private Bus Service Available within village.
Railway Station Available within 35 km distance nearest railway station are Jhalarapatan, Jhalawar, Bhawanimandi, Ujjain, Dewas, Bioara.

References 

Cities and towns in Agar Malwa district
Shajapur
Villages in Agar Malwa district